Aegyptosaurus  (meaning 'Egypt's lizard') is a genus of sauropod dinosaur that lived in what is now Africa, around 95 million years ago, during the Late Cretaceous Period (Cenomanian faunal stage).

Discovery and naming 

Aegyptosaurus was described by German paleontologist Ernst Stromer in 1932, seventeen years after the holotype was sent to Munich, and its fossils have been found in the Bahariya Formation of Egypt, the Farak Formation of Niger and in several other different locations in the Sahara Desert. The generic name, Aegyptosaurus, is derived from the country in which it was discovered and the Greek sauros meaning 'lizard'. All of the specimens destroyed in 1944 were discovered before 1939 and the fossils were stored together in Munich, but were obliterated when an Allied bombing raid destroyed the museum where they were kept on 25 April 1944, during World War II. Only fragments from other specimens still exist, mostly in the form of indeterminate specimens from Egypt and Niger.

de Lapparent (1960) referred a series of caudal vertebrae from the Continental intercalaire of Egypt to Aegyptosaurus baharijensis.

Description 

References 

Titanosaurs
Early Cretaceous dinosaurs of Africa
Late Cretaceous dinosaurs of Africa
Albian life
Cenomanian life
Fossils of Egypt
 
Cretaceous Africa
Fossils of Niger
Cretaceous Niger
Fossil taxa described in 1932
Taxa named by Ernst Stromer